I moralens navn (The Moral Reputation) is a Norwegian comedy film from 1954 directed by Olav Engebretsen. It stars Eva Lunde, Fridtjof Mjøen, and Anita Thallaug.

The film is based on Finn Bø's play with the same name, which premiered at the National Theatre in Oslo on September 22, 1937 and was directed by Bø himself. It was later performed that same year at the Trøndelag Theater.

Plot
Mona and Egil have grown up with a jumble of parents and stepparents. Now they have a total of three pairs of parents. Mona gets pregnant, and all her parents want her to get married. During the engagement party, the parents cheat on each other one by one, which leads to Mona escaping with her fiancé. They decide not to get married. The parents travel to Copenhagen to look for the escaped young people.

Cast
Eva Lunde as Sussie Krahn-Johnsen, Alf Mowitz's former wife
Fridtjof Mjøen as Birger Krahn-Johnsen, a director, formerly married to Ella
Anita Thallaug as Mona Mowitz (Krahn-Johnsen), Sussie's daughter from her first marriage
Jan Voigt as Egil Krahn-Johnsen, the director's son from his first marriage
Egil Åsman as Fredrik
Tore Foss as Otto Heymann, Ellas mann
Synnøve Gleditsch as Ella Heymann, Otto's wife, Egil's mother
Tage Lüneborg as the conductor at Lorry
Sigurd Magnussøn as old Krahn-Johnsen
Lillemor Nerem as Annelise
Lars Nordrum as Rolf Hagen
Thorleif Reiss as Alf Mowitz, formerly married to Sussie, Mona's father, and Agathe's husband
Carl Struve as Balthazar Krahn-Johnsen
Axel Thue as Consul Helm
Anne-Lise Wang as Agathe Mowitz, Alf's wife

References

External links 
 
 I moralens navn at the National Library of Norway
 I moralens navn at Filmfront

1954 films
1950s Norwegian-language films
Norwegian comedy films
1954 comedy films
Norwegian black-and-white films